Porsova (also, Porsovin) is a village and municipality in the Yardymli Rayon of Azerbaijan.  It has a population of 851.

References 

Populated places in Yardimli District